Brunon Godlewski (also called Bronisław) (7 January 1924 – 12 June 1989)  was a Polish-American airman of the Second World War. He served as an air gunner in the No. 305 Polish Bomber Squadron.

Biography
Godlewski was born in Chicago in a family of Polish emigrants. In 1942, he volunteered to the Polish Air Force and arrived in the UK via Canada. From May to June 1942 he trained as air-gunner. On 1 August 1942, he was sent to the No. 18 Operational Training Unit (18 OTU) where he joined the crew of Kazimierz Artymiuk. On 1 January 1943 the crew was assigned to the No. 305 Bomber Squadron.

Godlewski flew for the first time over occupied France on 26 January. During his 9th bomber raid, on the night of 5 March over Essen his Vickers Wellington was attacked by German night-fighters. As a tail gunner, Godlewski shooting on enemies, gave instructions to the pilot, how to avoid Messerschmitts. He was badly wounded on both arms and transported to the hospital in Bishop's Stortford where his arms were amputated. On 2 April, in hospital, the general Ujejski decorated him with the Virtuti Militari.

After leaving the hospital, Godlewski stayed in the UK until the end of 1943, participating in meetings with volunteers and soldiers. Later he returned to his parents in Chicago. His story was made famous by journalists on both sides of the ocean. They mainly pointed out his sacrifice for the country he has never seen. Polish Americans organized a fundraiser for him. Thanks to the collected money, Godlewski became owner of two bars run by his mother. In later years, he lived in California and Florida, where he died in 1989.

Awards
, Virtuti Militari, Silver Cross
 Cross of Valour (Poland), twice
 Distinguished Flying Medal
 Air Force Medal
 Distinguished Flying Cross (United States)
 Purple Heart

References

Further reading
 Wojciech Zmyślony: Virtuti Militari kaprala Godlewskiego, w: "Militaria XX wieku", nr 6/2007 (21). ISSN 1732-4491.

External links

Recipients of the Distinguished Flying Cross (United States)
Recipients of the Distinguished Flying Medal
Recipients of the Silver Cross of the Virtuti Militari
Recipients of the Cross of Valour (Poland)
1989 deaths
1924 births
American people of Polish descent
People from Chicago
Royal Air Force personnel of World War II
Royal Air Force airmen